Laksevåg is a former municipality in the old Hordaland county in Norway. The  municipality was located on the western part of the Bergen Peninsula.  The administrative centre of the municipality was the village of Loddefjord.  The municipality, which existed from 1918 until 1972, was a located a short distance west of the city of Bergen, and today it makes up the borough of Laksevåg which is part of the city of Bergen in Bergen Municipality which is now in Vestland county.  The municipality was located along the Byfjorden, north of the Grimstadfjorden, and west of the Fyllingsdalen valley.

History
The municipality of Laksevåg was established on 1 July 1918 when it was separated from the municipality of Askøy. Initially, the municipality had 6,957 residents. On 1 July 1921, the village area of Gyldenpris (population: 1,734) was transferred from Laksevåg to the growing city of Bergen, located to the east. On 1 January 1972, the city of Bergen was expanded and the four surrounding municipalities of Laksevåg (population: 24,672), Arna, Fana, and Åsane, were all merged with Bergen to form one large urban municipality with over 200,000 residents.

Municipal council
The municipal council  of Laksevåg was made up of 41 representatives that were elected to four-year terms.  The party breakdown of the final municipal council was as follows:

See also
List of former municipalities of Norway

References

Geography of Bergen
Former municipalities of Norway
1918 establishments in Norway
1972 disestablishments in Norway